Zagliveri is a village and a community of the Lagkadas municipality. Before the 2011 local government reform it was part of the municipality of Kallindoia, of which it was a municipal district and the seat. The 2011 census recorded 2,170 inhabitants in the village. The community of Zagliveri covers an area of 63.224 km2.

According to the statistics of Vasil Kanchov ("Macedonia, Ethnography and Statistics"), 900 Greek Christians and 260 Turks lived in the village in 1900.

In October 1913, Albanians from Mandritsa (Μανδρίτσα) settled in the village, following a Bulgarian invasion in their home village.

See also
 List of settlements in the Thessaloniki regional unit

References

Populated places in Thessaloniki (regional unit)